The Middle Pasco Islands comprise two similarly sized adjacent granite islands, with a combined area of 8.37 ha, in south-eastern Australia.  They form part of Tasmania’s Pasco Island Group, lying in eastern Bass Strait off the north-west coast of Flinders Island in the Furneaux Group.

Fauna
Seabirds and waders recorded as breeding on the islands include little penguin, short-tailed shearwater, white-faced storm-petrel and sooty oystercatcher.

See also

 List of islands of Tasmania

References

Furneaux Group